Ahuriri is a suburb of the city of Napier, in the Hawke's Bay region of New Zealand's eastern North Island.

The area was a major site of Māori and European settlement, and the site of the Port of Napier until the 1931 Hawke's Bay earthquake. It has since been redeveloped as a mixed commercial and residential area.

Demographics

Ahuriri had a population of 1,161 at the 2018 New Zealand census, an increase of 72 people (6.6%) since the 2013 census, and an increase of 303 people (35.3%) since the 2006 census. There were 510 households, comprising 528 males and 630 females, giving a sex ratio of 0.84 males per female. The median age was 59.4 years (compared with 37.4 years nationally), with 108 people (9.3%) aged under 15 years, 138 (11.9%) aged 15 to 29, 432 (37.2%) aged 30 to 64, and 486 (41.9%) aged 65 or older.

Ethnicities were 92.0% European/Pākehā, 10.6% Māori, 0.8% Pacific peoples, 2.8% Asian, and 1.6% other ethnicities. People may identify with more than one ethnicity.

The percentage of people born overseas was 18.3, compared with 27.1% nationally.

Although some people chose not to answer the census's question about religious affiliation, 45.0% had no religion, 44.7% were Christian, 0.8% had Māori religious beliefs, 0.8% were Hindu, 0.3% were Muslim, 0.3% were Buddhist and 1.6% had other religions.

Of those at least 15 years old, 231 (21.9%) people had a bachelor's or higher degree, and 195 (18.5%) people had no formal qualifications. The median income was $31,300, compared with $31,800 nationally. 189 people (17.9%) earned over $70,000 compared to 17.2% nationally. The employment status of those at least 15 was that 417 (39.6%) people were employed full-time, 114 (10.8%) were part-time, and 21 (2.0%) were unemployed.

Education

References

Suburbs of Napier, New Zealand
Populated places around Hawke Bay